Jacob Schwartz (born 13 March 1846, New York City) was an American librarian.

In 1863, Schwartz entered the Apprentices' library of New York, of which he became chief librarian in 1871. He introduced his system of classification at the library; this has since been adopted wholly or in part by various librarians. The system is a combination of the three fundamental subsystems — classified, alphabetical, and numerical. Methods of management that were followed there were also devised by him.

Schwartz contributed to the Library Journal and other periodicals.

References

 

1846 births
American librarians
Year of death missing